Neoplecostomus langeanii is a species of catfish in the family Loricariidae. It is native to South America, where it occurs in the Muzambinho River basin near Muzambinho in the state of Minas Gerais in Brazil. The species reaches 8.6 cm (3.3 inches) in standard length. Its specific name, langeanii, honors Francisco Langeani of São Paulo State University for his contributions to the ichthyology of the Neotropical realm.

References 

langeanii
Fish described in 2012
Catfish of South America
Freshwater fish of Brazil